Andrea Bodó, married Andrea Molnár-Bodó, Andrea Schmid-Bodó, and Andrea Schmid-Shapiro (4 August 1934 – 21 September 2022) was a Hungarian gymnast who competed in the 1952 Summer Olympics and in the 1956 Summer Olympics.

After 1956, the year of the Hungarian revolution suppressed by the army of the Soviet Union, she moved to the United States. She studied at the University of California. She became a rhythmic gymnastics coach, judge and administrator, serving as a member of the FIG RG technical committee for 17 years between 1984 and 2001. She also taught at the San Francisco State University.

Molnár-Bodó was first married to Miklos Molnar, sports journalist and fellow emigrant from Hungary, they had a daughter named Aniko. After splitting she married twice again, last time with physics professor Charles Shapiro.

Molnár-Bodó was also author of several books on gymnastics, like Introduction to Women's Gymnastics (1973, with Blanche Jessen Drury) and Modern rhythmic gymnastics (1976).

See also
List of Olympic female gymnasts for Hungary

References

1934 births
2022 deaths
Hungarian female artistic gymnasts
Olympic gymnasts of Hungary
Gymnasts at the 1952 Summer Olympics
Gymnasts at the 1956 Summer Olympics
Olympic gold medalists for Hungary
Olympic silver medalists for Hungary
Olympic bronze medalists for Hungary
Olympic medalists in gymnastics
Medalists at the 1956 Summer Olympics
Medalists at the 1952 Summer Olympics
20th-century Hungarian women
21st-century Hungarian women
Gymnasts from Budapest